San Jose Ojos de Agua is a municipality is located in the department of Chalatenango in the North of El Salvador

The Municipality
Ojos de Agua is a municipality in the Department of Chalatenango, El Salvador.  It is bordered to the north by Honduras; to the east by Honduras and Nueva Trinidad; to the south by Las Flores and Las Vueltas; and to the west by Concepción Quezaltepeque and El Carrizal.  The territorial extension of the municipality is 34.12 km2.  In 2005 the population of the municipality was 3,579 inhabitants.  For its administration, the municipality is divided into seven cantones and 19 caserios.

History of Ojos de Agua
The civilization of El Salvador dates from the Pre-Columbian Era, from around 1500 BC, according to experts (Embajada).  On May 31, 1522, the first of the Spanish, under the leadership of Captain Pedro de Alvarado, disembarked on the Isla Meanguera, located in the Gulf of Fonseca (Embajada). In June 1524 Captain Alvarado began a war of conquest against the indigenous people of Cuzcatlán (land of precious things). After 17 days of bloody battles many people died but the Spanish were not defeated, so they continued their conquest (Embajada). During the following centuries the Spanish maintained their control, with European families controlling the land and the native and African slaves (Lonely Planet). Towards the end of 1810 the Priest José Matías Delgado, with the support of many people, began a rebellion (Embajada).  After years of struggle, the Central American Independence Act was signed in Guatemala, on September 15, 1821 (Embajada).

By law, on February 18, 1841, the populations of Las Vueltas, Ojos de Agua and La Ceiba formed one electoral area.  The village of Ojos de Agua was designated as a formal town in 1867, although in 1855 the Presbyterian doctor Isidro Méndez declared it to be a town of the department of Chalatenango.  From May 12, 1902 until April 23, 1906, Ojos de Agua annexed the cantón El Zapotal, along with El Coyolar and Yurique, segregating them from the municipality of Las Vueltas.  The canton El Portillo was also segregated from the municipality of El Carrizal.  (Chalatenango Monografía del departamento y sus municipios. Instituto Geográfico Nacional Ingeniero Pablo Arnoldo Guzmán Centro Nacional de Registro. 1995.)

Due to the repression of the landowners, in 1931 farmers and indigenous citizens began a rebellion (Lonely Planet).  The army responded by killing 30,000 people, including the leader of the rebellion, Farabundo Martí, in a bloody act that was later referred to as La Matanza (The Massacre) (Lonely Planet).  But the people remained unhappy with the government.  This began a movement organized around leftist guerrillas to combat the repression violence (Stahler-Sholk, 1994:2).  The government responded with violence, and the Death Squads were formed, which eventually tortured and killed thousands of people (Foley 2006).  More political instability and the assassination of Archbishop Oscar Romero in 1980 sparked the beginning of the Civil War (Lonely Planet).  This war, which lasted 12 years, resulted in the death of an estimated 75,000 people and the displacement of thousands more (Stahler-Sholk, 1994:3).  The Peace Accords were signed on January 16, 1992 (Embajada).

The department of Chalatenango was heavily impacted by the Civil War.  Many people of Ojos de Agua were forced to abandon their homes because of the violence.  But beginning the early 1990s, and especially after the Peace Accords, the people have returned to repopulate the municipality.

Cantones and their Caseríos
Coyolar: 	
Coyolar,
Los Aparejos,
Los Navarro,
Casas Viejas

El Portillo:	
El Portillo,
El Cerro Pelón

El Sitio:	
El Sitio,
El Salitre

El Tablón:	
El Tablón,
Valle el Pito

El Zapotal:	
El Zapotal,
El Copinol

La Montoñita:	
La Montañita

Yurique:	
Yurique,
Las Pavas,
Las Aradas,
El Mandadero,
San Francisco,
El Aceituno

Source: Chalatenango Monografía del departamento y sus municipios. Instituto Geográfico Nacional Ingeniero Pablo Arnoldo Guzmán Centro Nacional de Registro. 1995.

Observation of the administrative political division
According to the inhabitants, the caseríos that compose canton Coyolar are now uninhabited.  The El caserío El Sitio in cantón El Portillo is known as Tierra Blanca (White Earth).  The caseío El Copinol in El Zapotal is uninhabited, as are all of the caseríos in cantón Yurique.

Historia de Cantones y Caseríos
According to the populace, the caseríos that compose canton Coyolar are uninhabited.  In cantón El Zapotal the caserío El Copinol is uninhabited, as are all the caseríos that compose cantón Yurique.  

According to the inhabitants, the municipality Ojos de Agua is named after the abundance of water sources in the area.  Los Sitios was so named because people used to stay there (“sitiaban”--“they surrounded”) temporarily while taking care of their animals in the area.

El Coyolar was named by the people because the men there were very “macho” (or coyoludos).

Politics
There are two main political parties in El Salvador, whose roots lie in the Civil War (Foley 2006, Stahler-Sholk 1994).  The main right-wing party is La Alianza Republicana Nacionalista (Nactionalist Republican Alliance—ARENA), founded on September 30, 1981, and was in power during the last few wars of the Civil War (ARENA 2007).  The Frente Farabundo Marti para La Liberacion Nacional (Farabundo Martí National Liberation Front—FMLN)
the socialist party, is the direct descendant of the guerrilla troops that fought against the Salvadoran government, and was legally constituted as a political party on September 1, 1992 (Stahler-Sholk 1994:3).  Since the Civil War the two have remained the country’s principal political parties, still divided by the left-right binary.  Today ARENA describes itself as a party in whose “forming principals express that a democratic and representational system, which guarantees the freedom of action and the consequences of individual peaceful goals, are the quickest and stablest path to achieve integral development of the nation” (ARENA 2007). The FMLN “has begun to take steps…to act as a consequence of the historically created challenges,  in order to make the party an organization of ‘social fighters…’and ‘to unify more’ the struggle for power (Comisión Nacional de Educación Política 2002).  Other political parties in El Salvador include The Christian Democratic Party, The United Democratic Center, and The Party of National Conciliation.

The mayor of Ojos de Agua is Prof. José Raúl Chinchilla Mejía, of the ARENA party.

Religion
83% of the population of El Salvador identifies as Roman Catholic, and the other 17% identify as “other” (CIA World Factbook).  But in the last few years the population of Catholicism has been reduced (USBDHRL).  There is a lot of Protestant activity in the country, and El Salvador has one of the highest rates of Protestantism in Latin America (Soltero y Saravia 2003:1).  There is no doubt that religion plays an important role in the lives of many people.  Patron-saint and other religious festivals are still very important and celebrated in almost all of the municipalities in the country, and almost all the cantones have their own patron-saint in whose honor the festival is celebrated.

Patron-Saint and Other Traditional Festivals
Urban center: March 16–19, in honor of St. Joseph; July 16, in honor of the Virgin del Carmen; October 28, in honor of St. Judas Tadeo
Coyolar: August 14–15, in honor of the Virgin de la Asunción (El Transito)
El Portillo: July 27, in honor of the Virgin del Perpetuo Socorro
El Sitio: May 3, in honor of the Holy Cross
El Tablón: May 15, in honor of St. Isidro Labrador; March 6, in honor of St. Anthony
El Zapotal: October 14–15, in honor of Jesús del Rescate
La Montoñita: May 3, in honor of the Holy Cross and St. Anthony

Music and Dance
The popular music used to be ranchera and some boleros.  Some commonly played instruments were violin, guitar and marimba.  Sometimes people made instruments with their own hands, such as flutes made with the stems of papaya-tree leaves and bamboo twigs.  Some people also made music with leaves from orange trees and coffee plants.  Serenades were also frequent.  Most of this music is no longer heard.

One of the traditional dances was called “La Raspa;” people also danced to ranchera music.

Agricultural Production
The production that has historically characterized the municipality is that of corn, beans, sorghum (maicillo), rice, and vegetables.  They also produce indigo, and one can still find the remains of the equipment used to manufacture the indigo although it is no longer in use.  The plant was crushed with water and then placed into a bottle, then the ink was prepared.  They also grow hibiscus flowers.

Food and Drink
Traditional foods include beans, tortillas, metas, soups, sweets, and seeds.  Other traditional foods and dishes include:

During the corn harvest people make different types of tamales, atole (a corn and milk-based drink), and corn on the cob.
There are many different types of types, such as sweet and savory, that can be made with different fillings, like meats and
vegetables, mainly potatoes. Pisques are big tamales that are made for people going on trips, so that they can carry them along.
Another typical dish is the balls of corn dough that are added to bean soup.
In this area people make candies and conserves out of various fruits.
Bean soup with young tender mango.
Mogo is a dish prepared out of tender bananas, which are ground and fried with sugar or salt.
Seeds of local plants, such as “paterna” and “pan.”

The majority of the ingredients used to make these foods and drinks are natural and are grown in the area.  They also form part of the biodiversity that, in some cases, is threatened or in danger of extinction.  Nevertheless, these habits are less common as more people eat commercially produced foods.

Tourist Sites
The natural pool of La Piedra Larga, located in Sumpul River, is a popular bathing place
El Tablón is a beautiful place, surrounded by mountains and with a nice climate
The following hills: El Tule, El Zarzal and El Cebollal, are actually part of the same geographic formation and can be found in front of the urban center of Ojos de Agua.
The natural pool Rumbadota
The natural pool Coponte

Artisan Products
Historically, in the municipality people made pots, tortillas pans, yellow scented candles from vegetable wax, balls of string, hammocks, mortars and pestles, lead-tipped fishing nets, woven mats, and sugar cane mills.
They also know how to make an alcoholic beverage known as “chaparro.”  This is now made clandestinely because it is illegal, although it is part of the cultural heritage of different villages.   It is used as a cure for hangovers and anemia, because it revitalizes people since it is a highly potent drink.

Archeological Sites
In El Tablón there are stones with drawings
In El Cerro Vivo there are stones with drawings and house foundations near the clinic.  In the house of Don Maximiliano Ayala there are stones with letters
In Piedra Larga there are pieces of pottery
In El Cebollal, La Montañona, and the zone of Naranjito there are obsidian and sparkling stones called “piedra centella.”

Citations
NOTE: Unless otherwise cited, all information extracted from Martínez Alas et al. "Diagnostico Cultural Municipio de Ojos de Agua, 2005."  Reprinted with express permission of the Unidad Tecnica Intermunicipal de La Mancomunidad la Montañona, who commissioned the report.
ARENA. 2007.  “Nuestra Historia.” Retrieved December 6, 2007.
CIA World Factbook.  November 15, 2007.  “El Salvador.” Retrieved December 5, 2007.
Comisión Nacional de Educación Política.  2002.  “Historia del FMLN.” Retrieved December 6, 2007.
Embajada de El Salvador en EE. UU. (Embajada), De la Civilización a la Independencia. Retrieved December 4, 2007.
Foley, Michael W.  2006.  Laying the Groundwork: The Struggle for Civil Society in El 	Salvador.  Journal of Interamerican Studies and World Affairs.  38 (1): 67-104.
Lonely Planet.  “El Salvador Background Information.” Retrieved December 3, 2007.
Martínez Alas, José Salomón, Aguilardo Pérez Yancky, Ismael Ernesto Crespín Rivera, and Deysi Ester Cierra Anaya.  2005.  “Diagnostico Cultural Municipio de Ojos de Agua, 2005.”  El Instituo para Rescate Ancestral Indígena (RAIS): El Salvador.
Stahler-Sholk, Richard.  1994.  El Salvador's Negotiated Transition: From Low-Intensity Conflict to Low-Intensity Democracy. Journal of Interamerican Studies and World Affairs.  36 (4): 1-59.
US Bureau of Democracy, Human Rights, and Labor (USBHRL).  November 8, 2005.  “International Religious Freedom Report 2005.”

Populated places in El Salvador
Geography of El Salvador